Alan Edward Smith  (born 9 October 1945) is a British geneticist who was Chief Scientific Officer of Genzyme from 1996 to 2011.

He was educated at Price's School, Fareham, Christ's College, Cambridge (BA, 1967) and completed his PhD at the MRC Laboratory of Molecular Biology in 1984. He was head of the biochemistry division at the National Institute for Medical Research in Mill Hill, London from 1980 to 1984. He revealed the genome structure of SV40, a DNA virus found in both humans and monkeys which can cause tumours.

He is on the boards of Arecor Therapeutics plc and Candel Therapeutics.

He was made a CBE in the 2005 New Year Honours for services to biotechnology research and to British trade development in the USA. He was made a Fellow of the Royal Society in 2010.

References

1945 births
Living people
Alumni of Christ's College, Cambridge
Fellows of Christ's College, Cambridge
Members of the European Molecular Biology Organization
Commanders of the Order of the British Empire
Fellows of the Royal Society
People from Fareham